The President of the Liberal Party of Australia is a senior position within the federal party. A member of both the party's two governing bodies (Federal Council, Federal Executive), the position was established at the same time as the party's foundation. The position was established by the party's constitution and has had nineteen different office-holders. The current president is John Olsen, elected president in August 2020.

Presidents of the Liberal Party

A list of leaders (including acting leaders) since 1945.

Notes

References

President
 
Liberal Party